Moses Hart (November 26, 1768 – October 15, 1852) was a Canadian businessman and seigneur, eldest son of Aaron Hart.

Biography
Moses Hart was born in Trois-Rivières to Aaron Hart and Dorothea Judah.

He was an unsuccessful candidate for the Legislative Assembly of Lower Canada, attempting to follow in the footsteps of his brother Ezekiel.

He invested in banks and had a successful business career, particularly in the shipping business. In 1824, he bought one ship, the Telegraph, from John Molson, and in 1833 he jointly invested with John Miller to buy the Lady Aylmer. He gave his share of the latter ship to his adopted son Alexander Thomas Hart, but Miller and the son had a falling-out.  He continued in the shipping business with his son Alexander Thomas and with his nephew Ira Craig Hart.

References

 

1768 births
1852 deaths
Moses Hart
Canadian people of English-Jewish descent
Canadian people of German-Jewish descent
Canadian Jews
Anglophone Quebec people
People from Trois-Rivières
Pre-Confederation Canadian businesspeople
19th-century Canadian Jews